This is a list of unicorn startup companies.

In finance, a unicorn is a privately held startup company with a current valuation of US$1 billion or more, across technology centers throughout the world.

Notable lists of unicorn companies are maintained by The Wall Street Journal, Fortune Magazine, CNNMoney/CB Insights, TechCrunch, PitchBook/Morningstar, and Tech in Asia.

History

List
Unicorns are concentrated in developed and some developing global regions, including a few dozen countries. As per CB Insights, as on October 7, 2022 the number of unicorn startups in some of the developed and developing countries were as follows: US (644), China (302), India (108), UK (46), Germany (29), France (24), Israel (22), Canada (19), Brazil (16), South Korea (16), Singapore (13), Indonesia (11), Australia (8), Mexico (8), Sweden (8), Hong Kong (7), Netherlands (7), Ireland (6), Japan (6), Switzerland (6), Norway (5), Spain (4), Belgium (3), Thailand (3), Turkey (3), UAE (3), Austria (2), Denmark (2), Estonia (2), Lithuania (2), Philippines (2).

{| class="wikitable sortable"
!Company
!Valuation(US$ billions)
!Valuation date
!Industry
!Country/countries
!Founder(s)
|-
|ByteDance
|140
|
|Internet
|
|Zhang Yiming, Liang Rubo
|-
|SpaceX
|127
|  
|Aerospace
|
|Elon Musk
|-
|Shein
|100
| 
|E-commerce
|
|Chris Xu
|-
|Stripe
|95
| 
|Financial services
| / 
|Patrick and John Collison
|-
|Canva
|40
| 
|Graphic design
|
|Melanie Perkins, Clifford Obrecht, Cameron Adams
|-
|Checkout.com
|40
|
|Financial technology
|
| Guillaume Pousaz
|-
|Instacart
|24
|
|Retail
|
|Apoorva Mehta, Max Mullen, Brandon Leonardo
|-
|Databricks
|38
|
|Software
|
|Ali Ghodsi
|-
|Revolut
|33
|
|Financial technology
|
|Nikolay Storonsky, Vlad Yatsenko
|-
|Epic Games
|31.5
|
|Video games
|
|Tim Sweeney
|-
|Telegram
|30
|
|Internet
| / 
|Nikolai and Pavel Durov
|-
|Fanatics
|27
|
|E-commerce
|
|Alan Trager, Mitch Trager, Michael Rubin
|-
|Chime
|25
|
|Financial services
|
|Chris Britt and Ryan King
|-
|Byju's
|22
|
|Educational technology
|
|Byju Raveendran, Divya Gokulnath
|-
|J&T Express
|20
|
|Logistics
|
|Jet Lee, Tony Chen
|-
|Xiaohongshu
|20
|
|E-commerce
|
|Miranda Qu Fang, Charlwin Mao Wenchao
|-
|Miro
|17.5
|
|Software
|
|Andrey Khusid
|-
|PayFit
|2.1
|
|Software
|
|Ghislain de Fontenay, Firmin Zoccchetto, Florian Fournier
|-
|Nature's Fynd
|Undisclosed
|
|Consumer packaged goods
|
|
|-
|Trendyol
|16.5
|
|E-commerce
|
|Demet Mutlu
|-
|Yuanfudao
|15.5
|
|Educational technology
|
|
|-
|Discord
|15
|
|Software
|
|Jason Citron, Stanislav Vishnevsky
|-
|DJI
|15
|
|Technology
|
|Frank Wang (Wang Tao)
|-
|GoPuff
|15
|
|E-commerce
|
|Yakir Gola, Rafael Ilishayev
|-
|Plaid
|13.4
|
|Financial technology
|
|Zach Perret, William Hockey
|-
|OpenSea
|13.3
|
|Blockchain
|
|
|-
|Grammarly
|13
|
|Collaborative software
|/
|Alex Shevchenko, Max Lytvyn, and Dmytro Lider
|-
|Devoted Health
|12.6
|
|Healthcare
|
|
|-
|Faire
|12.4
|
|E-commerce
|
|
|-
|Brex
|12.3
|October 2021
|Finance
|
|Henrique Dubugras and Pedro Franceschi
|-
|Biosplice Therapeutics
|12
|April 2021
|Health
|
|Osman Kibar
|-
|Bitmain
|12
|June 2018
|Cryptocurrency
|
|
|-
|GoodLeap
|12
|October 2021
|Financial technology
|
|
|-
|SenseTime
|12
|January 2021
|Artificial intelligence
| / 
|
|-
|Getir
|12
|March 2022
|Retail
|
|Nazım Salur
|-
|Northvolt
|11.75
|June 2021
|Batteries
|
|
|-
|Airtable
|11
|December 2021
|Collaborative software
|
|Howie Liu, Andrew Ofstad, Emmett Nicholas
|-
|Celonis
|11
|June 2021
|Software
|
|
|-
|ZongMu Technology
|11
|June 2021
|Self-driving cars
|
|
|-
|Bolt Financial
|11
|January 2022
|Financial technology
|
|Ryan Breslow
|-
|Alchemy
|10.2
|January 2022 
|Blockchain
|
|Joe Lau and Nikil Viswanathan
|-
|Swiggy
|10.7
|January 2022
|Food delivery
|
|Nandan Reddy, Sriharsha Majety
|-
|Aurora
|10
|December 2020
|Self-driving cars
|
|
|-
|Chehaoduo
|10
|July 2021
|Marketplace
|
|
|-
|Digital Currency Group
|10
|November 2021
|Venture capital
|
|
|-
|Figma
|10
|June 2021
|Software
|
|Dylan Field and Evan Wallace
|-
|Gusto
|10
|August 2021
|Software
|
|Joshua Reeves and Edward Kim
|-
|KuCoin
|10
|May 2022
|Cryptocurrency
|
|
|-
|Lalamove
|10
|January 2021
|Supply chain management
| / 
|
|-
|Notion Labs
|10
|October 2021
|Productivity software
|
|
|-
|Reddit
|10
|August 2021
|Internet media
|
|Steve Huffman, Aaron Swartz, Alexis Ohanian
|-
|Ripple
|10
|December 2019
|Cryptocurrency
|
|
|-
|Talkdesk
|10
|August 2021
|Software as a service
| / 
|Cristina Fonseca, Tiago Paiva
|-
|Oyo
|9.6
|August 2021
|Hospitality
|
|Ritesh Agarwal
|-
|Klaviyo
|9.5
|May 2021
|Marketing
|
|
|-
|OutSystems
|9.5
|February 2021
|Software development
|
|
|-
|ServiceTitan
|9.5
|June 2021
|Software
|
|
|-
|HeyTea
|9.3
|July 2021
|Retail
|
|
|-
|Tanium
|9
|June 2020
|Cybersecurity
|
|David Hindawi, Orion Hindawi
|-
|Kavak
|8.7
|October 2021
|Marketplace
|
|
|-
|Rapyd
|8.7
|August 2021
|Financial technology
|
|
|-
|Nuro
|8.6
|November 2021
|Robotics
|
|
|-
|Snyk
|8.5
|September 2021
|Application security
|
|
|-
|Bolt
|8.4
|January 2022
|Transportation
|
|Markus Villig
|-
|Lacework
|8.3
|November 2021
|Cloud security
|
|
|-
|Ramp
|8.1
|March 2022
|Financial technology
|
|
|-
|Tempus
|8.1
|December 2020
|Health
|
|
|-
|Dream11
|8
|November 2021
|Fantasy sports
|
|Harsh Jain, Bhavit Sheth
|-
|Flexport
|8
|February 2022
|Logistics
|
|Ryan Petersen
|-
|StarkWare Industries
|8
|May 2022 
|Blockchain
|
|Eli Ben-Sasson, Michael Riabzev, Uri Kolodny, Alessandro Chiesa
|-
|Hopin
|7.75
|August 2021
|Virtual event
|
|
|-
|Dapper Labs
|7.6
|September 2021
|NFT
|
|
|-
|Netskope
|7.5
|July 2021
|Computer security
|
|Sanjay Beri, Lebin Cheng, Ravi Ithal, Krishna Narayanaswamy
|-
|Razorpay
|7.5
|December 2021
|Financial technology
|
|Harshil Mathur, Shashank Kumar
|-
|Carta
|7.4
|August 2021
|Software
|
|Henry Ward
|-
|Ola Cabs
|7.3
|December 2021
|Transportation
|
|Bhavish Aggarwal, Ankit Bhati
|-
|Scale AI
|7.3
|April 2021
|Artificial intelligence
|
|
|-
|Gong
|7.25
|June 2021
|Artificial intelligence
|
|
|-
|TripActions
|7.25
|October 2021
|Travel
|
|Ariel Cohen and Ilan Twig
|-
|Automation Anywhere
|6.8
|November 2019
|Robotic process automation
|
|
|-
|1Password
|6.8
|July 2021
|Password manager
|
|
|-
|WeDoctor
|6.8
|February 2021
|Healthcare
|
|
|-
|Yanolja
|6.7
|July 2021
|Hospitality
|
|Lee Su-jin
|-
|Ziroom
|6.6
|March 2020
|Real estate technology
|
|
|-
|Klarna
|6.5
|July 2022
|Financial technology
|
|Sebastian Siemiatkowski, Niklas Adalberth, Victor Jacobsson
|-
|Mollie
|6.5
|June 2021
|Financial technology
|
|
|-
|Rippling
|11.25
|August 2022
|Workforce management
|
|Parker Conrad
|-
|CRED
|6.4
|June 2022
|Financial technology
|
|Kunal Shah
|-
|DataRobot
|6.3
|July 2021
|Artificial intelligence
|
|
|-
|Personio
|6.3
|October 2021
|Software
|
|
|-
|Doctolib
|6.2
|August 2022
|Healthcare
|
|
|-
|Lianjia (Homelink)
|6.04
|April 2017
|Real estate
|
|
|-
|Better.com
|6
|April 2021
|Financial services
|
|
|-
|Wiz
|6
|October 2021
|Cybersecurity
|
|
|-
|Xingsheng Youxuan
|6
|January 2021
|Retail
|
|
|-
|Back Market
|5.8
|August 2022
|Marketplace
|
|
|-
|Vice Media
|5.7
|February 2020
|Mass media
|
|
|-
|Contentsquare
|5.6
|August 2022
|Software as a service
|
|
|-
|Fivetran
|5.6
|September 2021
|Data infrastructure
|
|
|-
|PharmEasy
|5.6
|October 2021
|Health technology
|
|Siddharth Shah
|-
|Postman
|5.6
|August 2021
|Software as a service
| / 
|
|-
|Airwallex
|5.5
|November 2021
|Financial services
| / 
|
|-
|PhonePe
|5.5
|December 2020
|Financial technology
|
|Sameer Nigam, Rahul Chari
|-
|Viva Republica (Toss)
|5.48
|June 2021
|Financial technology
|
|
|-
|Pony.ai
|5.3
|November 2020
|Artificial intelligence
| / 
|James Peng, Tiancheng Lou
|-
|Trade Republic
|5.3
|May 2021
|Financial technology
|
|
|-
|Rappi
|5.25
|July 2021
|Transportation
|
|
|-
|Blockchain.com
|5.2
|March 2021
|Cryptocurrency
|
|
|-
|OneTrust
|5.1
|December 2020
|Cybersecurity
| / 
|
|-
|SambaNova
|5.1
|April 2021
|Artificial intelligence
|
|
|-
|Collibra
|5+
|January 2019
|Data governance
|
|Pieter De Leenheer, Felix Van de Maele, Stijn Christiaens
|-
|Thrasio
|5+
|October 2021
|Holding company
|
|Josh Silberstein and Carlos Cashman
|-
|CloudKitchens
|5
|November 2019
|Ghost kitchen
|
|
|-
|Hello TransTech
|5
|March 2021
|Transportation
|
|
|-
|Hopper
|5
|August 2021
|Travel
|
|
|-
|JUUL Labs
|5
|October 2019
|Electronic cigarettes
|
|
|-
|OfBusiness
|5
|December 2021
|B2B e-commerce
|
|Bhuvan Gupta, Vasant Sridhar, Ruchi Kalra, Nitin Jain, Asish Mohapatra
|-
|Ola Electric
|5
|January 2022
|Electric vehicles
|
|Bhavish Aggarwal
|-
|Qonto
|5
|August 2022
|Finance
|
|
|-
|Ro
|5
|March 2021
|Health technology
|
|
|-
|Royole
|5
|August 2018
|Flexible electronics
| / 
|
|-
|UBtech Robotics
|5
|May 2018
|Robotics
|
|-
|GetBlock
|4.6
|June 2020
|Blockchain
|
|Steven Lloyd
|-
|-
|United Imaging Healthcare
|5
|September 2017
|Healthcare
|
|
|-
|Zepz
|5
|August 2021
|Financial technology
|
|
|-
|Animoca Brands
|5
|January 2022
|Blockchain gaming
|
|Yat Siu
|-
|Octopus Energy
|5
|December 2021
|Energy supply
|
|
|-
|Meesho
|4.9
|September 2021
|E-commerce
|
|Vidit Aatrey, Sanjeev Barnwal
|-
|-
|Pleo
|4.7
|December 2021
|Financial technology
|
|
|-
|Anduril Industries
|4.6
|June 2021
|Defense technology
|
|Palmer Luckey
|-
|Checkr
|4.6
|August 2021
|Human resource management
|
|
|-
|Dataiku
|4.6
|August 2021
|Artificial intelligence
| / 
|
|-
|Sorare
|4.6
|August 2022
|Fantasy sports
|
|
|-
|Magic Leap
|4.5
|February 2016
|Augmented reality
|
|
|-
|Socure
|4.5
|November 2021
|Identity management
|
|
|-
|Vinted
|4.5
|May 2021
|Marketplace
|
|Milda Mitkutė, Justas Janauskas
|-
|Zenefits
|4.5
|May 2015
|Human resource management
|
|
|-
|Meizu
|4.4
|October 2016
|Consumer electronics
|
|
|-
|Outreach
|4.4
|June 2021
|Sales
|
|
|-
|Arctic Wolf Networks
|4.3
|July 2021
|Cybersecurity
|
|
|-
|Chainalysis
|4.2
|June 2021
|Blockchain
|
|
|-
|Relativity Space
|4.2
|June 2021
|Aerospace
|
|
|-
|SSENSE
|4.15
|June 2021
|E-commerce
|
|
|-
|Bitpanda
|4.1
|August 2021
|Cryptocurrency
|
|
|-
|Dataminr
|4.1
|March 2021
|Data analytics
|
|
|-
|Yello Mobile
|4.05
|November 2016
|Software industry
|
|
|-
|Branch Metrics
|4
|February 2022
|Marketing
|
|
|-
|BrowserStack
|4
|June 2021
|Software
|
|Ritesh Arora, Nakul Aggarwal
|-
|Clubhouse
|4
|April 2021
|Messaging
|
|Paul Davison and Rohan Seth
|-
|Houzz
|4
|June 2017
|Interior design
|
|
|-
|iCapital Network
|4
|July 2021
|Financial services
|
|
|-
|Megvii
|4
|May 2019
|Technology
|
|
|-
|Melio
|4
|September 2021
|Financial technology
|
|
|-
|Next Insurance
|4
|March 2021
|Insurance
|
|
|-
|Olive
|4
|June 2021
|Health technology
|
|
|-
|Patreon
|4
|April 2021
|Online membership service
|
|Jack Conte, Sam Yam
|-
|PointClickCare
|4
|January 2021
|Software
|
|
|-
|
|4
|May 2021
|Real estate
|
|
|-
|Niantic
|3.95
|January 2019
|Video games
|
|
|-
|StockX
|3.8
|April 2021
|E-commerce
|
|
|-
|Articulate
|3.75
|July 2021
|Educational technology
|
|
|-
|Cohesity
|3.7
|March 2021
|Software
|
|
|-
|Noom
|3.7
|May 2021
|Healthcare
|
|
|-
|Papaya Global
|3.7
|September 2021
|Workforce management
| / 
|
|-
|ShareChat
|3.7
|December 2021
|Social network
|
|Ankush Sachdeva, Bhanu Pratap Singh, Farid Ahsan
|-
|VAST Data
|3.7
|May 2021
|Data storage
|
|
|-
|WHOOP
|3.6
|August 2021
|Wearable technology
|
|
|-
|Shouqi
|3.55
|December 2016
|Transportation
|
|
|-
|Alchemy
|3.5
|October 2021
|Blockchain
|
|
|-
|Coalition
|3.5
|September 2021
|Cybersecurity
|
|
|-
|Commure
|3.5
|September 2021
|Health technology
|
|
|-
|Digit Insurance
|3.5
|July 2021
|Insurance
|
|Kamesh Goyal
|-
|Mirakl
|3.5
|September 2021
|Marketplace
|
|
|-
|N26
|3.5
|July 2019
|Financial services
|
|
|-
|OwnBackup
|3.35
|August 2021
|Data storage
|
|
|-
|Preferred Networks
|3.33
|September 2019
|Artificial intelligence
|
|
|-
|CARS24
|3.3
|December 2021
|Marketplace
|
|Vikram Chopra, Mehul Agrawal, Gajendra Jangid and Ruchit Agarwal
|-
|Kurly
|3.3
|July 2021
|E-commerce
|
|
|-
|Rubrik
|3.3
|January 2019
|Computer storage
|
|Bipul Sinha, Arvind Jain, Soham Mazumdar, Arvind Nithrakashyap
|-
|Scopely
|3.3
|October 2020
|Mobile gaming
|
|
|-
|WeRide
|3.3
|June 2021
|Self-driving cars
|
|
|-
|Youxia Motors
|3.3
|October 2018
|Electric vehicles
|
|
|-
|MoonPay
|3.4
|November 2021
|Cryptocurrency
|
|
|-
|Unacademy
|3.4
|August 2021
|Educational technology
|
|Gaurav Munjal
|-
|Plus.ai
|3.3
|May 2021
|Self-driving trucks
|
|
|-
|Starburst Data
|3.3
|February 2022
|Data analytics
|
|
|-
|Thumbtack
|3.2
|June 2021
|Software
|
|Marco Zappacosta
|-
|ApplyBoard
|3.2
|June 2021
|Educational technology
|
|Martin Basiri, Massi Basiri, Meti Basiri
|-
|Blockstream
|3.2
|August 2021
|Blockchain
|
|
|-
|ConsenSys
|3.2
|November 2021
|Blockchain
|
|
|-
|Cybereason
|3.2
|July 2021
|Cybersecurity
| / 
|
|-
|Eruditus
|3.2
|August 2021
|Educational technology
|
|
|-
|PsiQuantum
|3.15
|July 2021
|Quantum computing
|
|
|-
|SpotOn
|3.15
|September 2021
|Financial technology
|
|
|-
|TiendaNube
|3.1
|August 2021
|E-commerce
|
|
|-
|SentinelOne
|3.1
|November 2020
|Cybersecurity
|
|
|-
|Udaan
|3.1
|January 2021
|B2B e-commerce
|
|Vaibhav Gupta, Amod Malviya, Sujeet Kumar
|-
|Wildlife
|3+
|August 2020
|Mobile gaming
|
|
|-
|CMR Surgical
|3
|January 2021
|Robotics
|
|
|-
|Traveloka
|3
|January 2017
|Travel
|
|
|-
|ActiveCampaign
|3
|April 2021
|Marketing
|
|
|-
|Age of Learning, Inc.
|3
|June 2021
|Education
|
|
|-
|Automattic
|3
|September 2019
|Internet
|
|Matt Mullenweg
|-
|Calendly
|3
|January 2021
|Software
|
|Tope Awotona
|-
|Contentful
|3
|July 2021
|Content management system
|
|
|-
|Forter
|3
|May 2021
|Software
| / 
|
|-
|Grafana Labs
|3
|August 2021
|Software
|
|
|-
|Groww
|3
|April 2021
|Financial technology
|
|Lalit Keshre, Harsh Jain, Ishan Bansal, Neeraj Singh
|-
|Hinge Health
|3
|January 2021
|Healthcare
|
|
|-
|Horizon Robotics
|3
|February 2018
|Semiconductors
|
|
|-
|Lucid Software
|3
|June 2021
|Software
|
|
|-
|MessageBird
|3
|October 2020
|Cloud communications
|
|
|-
|Pine Labs
|5
|February 2022
|Financial technology
|
|Lokvir Kapoor, Rajul Garg, Tarun Upaday
|-
|Seismic
|3
|August 2021
|Software
|
|
|-
|Sky Mavis
|3
|October 2021
|Video games
|
|
|-
|Souche
|3
|September 2018
|Marketplace
|
|
|-
|TradingView
|3
|October 2021
|Finance
|
|
|-
|Upstox
|3
|November 2021
|Financial technology
|
|Ravi Kumar, Kavitha Subramanian, Shrini Viswanath
|-
|VANCL
|3
|February 2014
|E-commerce
|
|
|-
|Veepee
|3
|August 2022
|E-commerce
|
|
|-
|VIPKID
|3
|June 2018
|Education
|
|
|-
|Warby Parker
|3
|August 2020
|Retail
|
|
|-
|Wefox
|3
|June 2021
|Insurance
|
|
|-
|Yixia Technology
|3
|November 2016
|Internet media
|
|
|-
|New York General Group, Inc.
|3
|September 2022
|Superintelligence・Quantum computing・Metaverse
|
|
|-
|OVO
|2.9
|March 2019
|Financial technology
|
|
|-
|Workrise
|2.9
|May 2021
|Workforce management
|
|
|-
|DriveWealth
|2.85
|August 2021
|Financial technology
|
|
|-
|BharatPe
|2.8
|August 2021
|Financial technology
|
|Ashneer Grover
|-
|Graphcore
|2.8
|December 2020
|Semiconductors
|
|
|-
|Icertis
|2.8
|March 2021
|Software
| / 
|Samir Bodas, Monish Darda.
|-
|OakNorth
|2.8
|February 2019
|Finance
|
|
|-
|UnionPay
|2.8
|October 2016
|Finance
|
|
|-
|Urban Company
|2.8
|December 2021
|Home improvement
|
|
|-
|Bird
|2.78
|October 2019
|Transportation
|
|
|-
|Convoy
|2.75
|November 2019
|Trucking
|
|
|-
|Illumio
|2.75
|June 2021
|Cybersecurity
|
|
|-
|MasterClass
|2.75
|May 2021
|Educational technology
|
|
|-
|Zipline
|2.75
|June 2021
|Logistics
|
|
|-
|Daangn Market
|2.7
|August 2021
|E-commerce
|
|
|-
|Tridge
|2.7
|August 2022
|Software as a service
|
|
|-
|Nextiva
|2.7
|September 2021
|Software
|
|
|-
|Tradeshift
|2.7
|March 2021
|Financial technology
|
|
|-
|Deliverect
|1.4
|January 2022
|Ordering software for POS
|
|
|-
|Odoo
|2.63
|July 2021
|CRM
|
|
|-
|AmWINS Group
|2.6
|October 2016
|Insurance
|
|
|-
|ManoMano
|2.6
|July 2021
|E-commerce
|
|
|-
|Pendo
|2.6
|July 2021
|Software
|
|
|-
|Sourcegraph
|2.6
|July 2021
|Developer platform
|
|
|-
|Jumpcloud
|2.56
|September 2021
|Software
|
|
|-
|Cato Networks
|2.5
|October 2021
|Cybersecurity
|
|
|-
|eToro
|2.5
|December 2020
|Financial technology
|
|
|-
|Infra.Market
|2.5
|August 2021
|Marketplace
|
|Aaditya Sharda, Souvik Sengupta
|-
|DriveNets
|2.5+
|August 2022
|Network operating system, Software-defined networking, Software as a service
|
|Ido Susan, Hillel Kobrinsky
|-
|Lenskart
|2.5
|May 2021
|Retail
|
|Peyush Bansal, Amit Chaudhary, Sumeet Kapahi
|-
|Monzo
|2.5
|June 2019
|Financial services
|
|
|-
|Ualá
|2.45
|November 2019
|Personal finance
|
|
|-
|HoneyBook
|2.4
|November 2021
|Financial services
| / 
|
|-
|BitSight
|2.4
|September 2021
|Cybersecurity
|
|Nagarjuna Venna, Stephen Boyer
|-
|Exabeam
|2.4
|June 2021
|Cybersecurity
|
|
|-
|Paxos
|2.4
|April 2021
|Cryptocurrency
|
|
|-
|Mozido
|2.39
|October 2014
|E-commerce
|
|
|-
|Wemakeprice
|2.33
|September 2015
|E-commerce
|
|Huh Min
|-
|Highspot
|2.3
|February 2021
|Sales
|
|
|-
|MPL
|2.3
|September 2021
|Mobile gaming
|
|
|-
|Uptake
|2.3
|November 2017
|Asset performance management
|
|
|-
|Algolia
|2.25
|June 2021
|Software
| / 
|
|-
|KeepTruckin
|2.25
|June 2021
|Logistics
|
|
|-
|Via Transportation
|2.25
|March 2020
|Transportation
|
|
|-
|Zume
|2.25
|November 2018
|Food packaging, Logistics
|
|Alex Garden, Julia Collins
|-
|Acorns
|2.2
|May 2021
|Financial technology
|
|
|-
|Bitso
|2.2
|May 2021
|Cryptocurrency
|
|
|-
|Gympass
|2.2
|June 2021
|Fitness
| / 
|
|-
|Transmit Security
|2.2
|June 2021
|Cybersecurity
| / 
|
|-
|Addepar
|2.17
|June 2021
|Financial technology
|
|
|-
|Eightfold.ai
|2.1+
|June 2021
|Artificial intelligence
|
|
|-
|6sense
|2.1
|March 2021
|Artificial intelligence
|
|
|-
|
|2.1
|December 2020
|Financial services
|
|
|-
|Mambu
|2.1
|January 2021
|Financial technology
|
|
|-
|Moveworks
|2.1
|June 2021
|Artificial intelligence
|
|
|-
|Nextdoor
|2.1
|May 2019
|Social network
|
|
|-
|Webflow
|2.1
|January 2021
|Web development
|
|
|-
|bKash
|2+
|November 2021
|Mobile financial services
|
|Kamal Quadir
|-
|Babylon Health
|2+
|August 2019
|Healthcare
|
|
|-
|Bought By Many
|2+
|June 2021
|Insurance
|
|
|-
|FlixMobility
|2+
|August 2019
|Transportation
|
|
|-
|Tipalti
|2+
|October 2020
|Financial technology
| / 
|
|-
|XtalPi
|2+
|August 2021
|Pharmaceuticals
|
|
|-
|Hive
|2
|April 2021
|Artificial intelligence
|
|Kevin Guo, Dmitriy Karpman
|-
|Mural
|2
|July 2021
|Technology
| / 
|Patricio Jutard
|-
|Aiven
|2
|October 2021
|Data infrastructure
|
|
|-
|AppsFlyer
|2
|November 2020
|Mobile marketing analytics
| / 
|
|-
|Beijing Weiying Technology
|2
|April 2016
|E-commerce, movie ticket distributor
|
|
|-
|BlaBlaCar
|2
|April 2021
|Transportation
|
|
|-
|Calm
|2
|December 2020
|Digital health
|
|Michael Acton Smith, Alex Tew
|-
|Clearco
|2
|April 2021
|Financial services
|
|
|-
|ClickHouse
|2
|October 2021
|Database management
|
|
|-
|Clip
|2
|June 2021
|Financial technology
|
|
|-
|Cockroach Labs
|2
|January 2021
|Database management
|
|
|-
|Divvy Homes
|2
|August 2021
|Real estate technology
|
|
|-
|Druva
|2
|April 2021
|Cloud computing
| / 
|
|-
|Exotec
|2
|August 2022
|Robotics
|
|
|-
|Firstp2p
|2
|September 2016
|Financial services
|
|
|-
|Formlabs
|2
|May 2021
|3D printing
|
|
|-
|Huimin.cn
|2
|September 2016
|B2B e-commerce
|
|
|-
|Iterable
|2
|June 2021
|Marketing
|
|
|-
|Kry
|2
|April 2021
|Healthcare
|
|
|-
|Meicai.cn
|2
|June 2016
|Agriculture, E-commerce
|
|
|-
|Mynt
|2
|November 2021
|Financial technology
|
|
|-
|OPay
|2
|August 2021
|Financial technology
|
|
|-
|Oxford Nanopore Technologies
|2
|November 2012
|Nanopore sequencing
|
|
|-
|Sword Health
|2
|November 2021
|Health
| /  
|
|-
|Taopiaopiao
|2
|July 2017
|E-commerce, movie ticket distributor
|
|
|-
|Trendy International Group
|2
|February 2012
|Fashion, Retail
| / 
|
|-
|Unqork
|2
|October 2020
|Software development
|
|
|-
|Zerodha
|2
|May 2021
|Financial technology
|
|
|-
|Zilch
|2
|November 2021
|Financial technology
|
|
|-
|Akulaku
|2
|February 2022
|Financial technology
|
|
|-
|Ankorstore
|1.98
|August 2022
|Marketplace
|
|
|-
|Avant
|1.98
|September 2015
|Consumer finance
|
|
|-
|Intarcia Therapeutics
|1.95
|September 2016
|Pharmaceutical
|
|
|-
|ThoughtSpot
|1.95
|August 2019
|Analytics
|
|
|-
|Yinlong Group
|1.95
|December 2016
|Energy
|
|
|-
|Sanpower Group
|1.93
|March 2018
|Holding company
|
|
|-
|ZigBang
|1.93
|June 2022
|Property technology
|
|
|-
|Bunq
|1.9
|July 2021
|Financial services
|
|
|-
|CoinSwitch Kuber
|1.9
|October 2021
|Cryptocurrency
|
|Ashish Singhal, Vimal Sagar Tiwari, Govind Soni
|-
|Dfinity
|1.9
|August 2018
|Cloud computing
|
|
|-
|Prosper Marketplace
|1.9
|August 2015
|Financial technology
|
|
|-
|Musinsa
|1.89
|November 2019
|Fashion
|
|
|-
|Apus Group
|1.85
|August 2017
|Mobile internet
|
|
|-
|BenevolentAI
|1.85
|August 2015
|Drug discovery
|
|
|-
|MEGAZONE
|1.83
|Aug 2022
|Cloud computing
|
|
|-
|BillDesk
|1.8
|November 2018
|Financial technology
|
|M.N. Srinivasu, Ajay Kaushal, Karthik Ganapathy
|-
|Landa Digital Printing
|1.8
|June 2018
|Printing
|
|
|-
|Lightricks
|1.8
|September 2021
|Software development
|
|
|-
|NantOmics
|1.8
|June 2015
|Biotechnology
|
|
|-
|Orca Security
|1.8
|October 2021
|Cybersecurity
|
|
|-
|Quora
|1.8
|April 2017
|Social network
|
|
|-
|Zocdoc
|1.8
|August 2015
|Healthcare
|
|
|-
|L&P Cosmetic
|1.78
|March 2018
|Cosmetics
|
|
|-
|
|1.75
|December 2020
|Financial services
|
|
|-
|Spinny
|1.75
|November 2021
|Marketplace
|
|Niraj Singh, Ramanshu Mahaur, Ganesh Pawar, Mohit Gupta
|-
|Trulioo
|1.75
|June 2021
|Identity management
|
|
|-
|AlphaSense
|1.7
|June 2022
|Software
|
|
|-
|Dragos
|1.7
|October 2021
|Cybersecurity
|
|
|-
|dutchie
|1.7
|March 2021
|Cannabis
|
|
|-
|Harness
|1.7
|June 2021
|Software
|
|Jyoti Bansal
|-
|PAX Labs
|1.7
|April 2019
|Cannabis
|
|
|-
|Taihe Music Group
|1.7
|June 2018
|
|
|
|-
|Vestiaire Collective
|1.7
|September 2021
|Marketplace
|
|
|-
|Voodoo
|1.7
|August 2022
|Gaming
|
|
|-
|
|1.7
|September 2020
|Technology
|
|
|-
|Wave
|1.7
|September 2021
|Financial technology
| / 
|
|-
|Workato
|1.7
|December 2020
|Technology
|
|
|-
|Alan
|1.68
|April 2021
|Health technology
|
|
|-
|GoStudent
|1.67
|June 2021
|Educational technology
|
|
|-
|Hibob
|1.65
|October 2021
|HR technology
| /  
|
|-
|Solarisbank
|1.65
|July 2021
|Financial technology
|
|
|-
|Wayflyer
|1.6
|Feb 2022
|Financial technology
|
|
|-
|Afiniti
|1.6
|May 2017
|Software development
|
|
|-
|Aiways
|1.6
|April 2018
|Electric vehicles
|
|
|-
|Caocao Zhuanche
|1.6
|January 2018
|
|
|
|-
|Clari
|1.6
|March 2021
|Software
|
|
|-
|Clio
|1.6
|April 2021
|Legal technology
|
|
|-
|Cognite
|1.6
|May 2021
|Software
|
|
|-
|HomeLight
|1.6
|September 2021
|Real estate
|
|
|-
|Infinidat
|1.6
|October 2017
|Data storage
| / 
|
|-
|Judo Bank
|1.6
|December 2020
|Financial services
|
|
|-
|Nord Security
|1.6
|April 2022
|VPN service
|
|Tom Okman, Eimantas Sabaliauskas, Jonas Karklys
|-
|SafetyCulture
|1.6
|May 2021
|Technology
|
|Luke Anear
|-
|SmartHR
|1.6
|May 2021
|HR technology
|
|
|-
|Unite Us
|1.6
|March 2021
|Healthcare
|
|
|-
|CureFit
|1.56
|November 2021
|
|
|Mukesh Bansal, Ankit Nagori
|-
|HeartFlow
|1.5+
|February 2018
|
|
|
|-
|Aihuishou
|1.5
|January 2018
|
|
|
|-
|Andela
|1.5
|September 2021
|Education
| / 
|
|-
|Culture Amp
|1.5
|July 2021
|Software
|
|
|-
|Devo Inc
|1.5
|October 2021
|Software
|
|
|-
|Gett
|1.5
|May 2019
|Transportation
|
|
|-
|ID.me
|1.5
|March 2021
|Identity verification service
|
|
|-
|Ledger
|1.5
|June 2021
|Cryptocurrency
|
|
|-
|Matillion
|1.5
|September 2021
|Data analytics
|
|
|-
|MOLOCO
|1.5
|August 2021
|Advertising technology
|
|
|-
|Mu Sigma
|1.5
|February 2013
|Management consulting
| / 
|
|-
|NextSilicon
|1.5
|June 2021
|Semiconductors
|
|
|-
|NotCo
|1.5
|July 2021
|Food technology
|
|
|-
|Podium
|1.5
|August 2019
|Software
|
|
|-
|Remote
|1.5
|July 2021
|Software
|
|
|-
|Spring Rain Software
|1.5
|June 2016
|
|
|
|-
|Starling Bank
|1.5
|March 2021
|Financial technology
|
|
|-
|Tujia.com
|1.5
|October 2017
|
|
|
|-
|ZBJ.com
|1.5
|June 2015
|
|
|
|-
|Ascend Money
|1.5
|September 2021
|Financial technology
|
|
|-
|Hellobike
|1.47
|June 2018
|
|
|
|-
|Suning Sports
|1.47
|July 2018
|Holding company
|
|
|-
|Koudai Gouwu
|1.45
|October 2014
|
|
|
|-
|M1 Finance
|1.45
|July 2021
|Financial technology
|
|
|-
|Zeta
|1.45
|May 2021
|Financial technology
|
|Bhavin Turakhia, Ramki Gaddipati
|-
|Away
|1.4
|May 2019
|Retail
|
|
|-
|Bucketplace
|1.4
|May 2022
|Interior design
|
|
|-
|Cabify
|1.4
|January 2018
|Transportation
|
|
|-
|Chargebee
|1.4
|April 2021
|Financial technology
| / 
|
|-
|Epidemic Sound
|1.4
|March 2021
|Music
|
|Peer Åström, David Stenmarck, Oscar Höglund, Jan Zachrisson
|-
|FiscalNote
|1.4
|May 2021
|Data analytics
|
|Timothy Hwang, Gerald Yao, Jonathan Chen
|-
|Five Star Finance
|1.4
|March 2021
|Financial services
|
|
|-
|Gupshup
|1.4
|April 2021
|Messaging
| / 
|
|-
|IAD
|1.4
|Oct 2021
|Real estate
|
|
|-
|NetDocuments
|1.4
|May 2021
|Software
|
|
|-
|Panther Labs, Inc.
|1.4
|December 2021
|Computer security
|
|Jack Naglieri
|-
|Pristyn Care
|1.4
|December 2021
|Health technology
|
|
|-
|QOMPLX, Inc.
|1.4
|March 2021
|Computer security
|
|
|-
|Rebel Foods
|1.4
|October 2021
|Ghost kitchen
|
|
|-
|Stash
|1.4
|February 2021
|Financial technology
|
|
|-
|Symphony
|1.4
|June 2019
|Software
|
|
|-
|Voyager
|1.4
|April 2022
|Financial technology
|
|
|-
|Yotpo
|1.4
|March 2021
|Marketing
| / 
|
|-
|RIDI
|1.33
|August 2021
|E-commerce
|
|
|-
|Zetwerk
|1.33
|August 2021
|
|
|
|-
|GPClub
|1.32
|December 2018
|
|
|
|-
|DistroKid
|1.3
|August 2021
|Music
|
|
|-
|ETCP
|1.3
|October 2016
|
|
|
|-
|Feedzai
|1.3
|March 2021
|Artificial intelligence
| / 
|
|-
|G2
|1.3
|June 2021
|Technology
|
|Tim Handorf, Godard Abel, Matt Gorniak, Mark Myers, Mike Wheeler
|-
|Innovaccer
|1.3
|February 2021
|Health care
| / 
|Abhinav Shashank, Kanav Hasija, Sandeep Gupta
|-
|Knotel
|1.3
|August 2019
|
|
|
|-
|Konfio
|1.3
|September 2021
|Financial services
|
|
|-
|Kr Space
|1.3
|June 2018
|
|
|
|-
|Yugabyte
|1.3
|October 2021
|Database management
|
|
|-
|Incode
|1.25
|December 2021
|Technology
|
|
|-
|Applied Intuition
|1.25
|October 2020
|Software
|
|
|-
|BigID
|1.25
|May 2018
|Cybersecurity
| / 
|
|-
|Deel
|1.25
|April 2021
|
| / 
|
|-
|ezCater
|1.25
|April 2019
|
|
|Stefania Mallett, Briscoe Rodgers
|-
|Iwjw
|1.25
|November 2015
|
|
|
|-
|Marshmallow
|1.25
|September 2021
|Insurance
|
|
|-
|Rec Room
|1.25
|March 2021
|Video games
|
|
|-
|Nexii
|1.23
|September 2021
|Building services engineering
|
|
|-
|Spiber
|1.22
|September 2021
|Biotechnology
|
|
|-
|Mamaearth
|1.2
|January 2022
|Personal care
|
|Varun Alagh and Ghazal Alagh
|-
|Merama
|1.2
|December 2021
|E-commerce
|
|
|-
|Jokr
|1.2
|June 2021
|Transportation
|
|
|-
|Ada
|1.2
|May 2021
|Software
|
|
|-
|Alation
|1.2
|June 2021
|Software
|
|Satyen Sangani, Aaron Kalb, Feng Niu, and Venky Ganti
|-
|Apotea
|1.2
|April 2021
|E-commerce
|
|
|-
|Axonius
|1.2
|March 2021
|Cybersecurity
| / 
|
|-
|Byton
|1.2
|June 2018
|Automotive
|
|
|-
|CarDekho
|1.2
|October 2021
|Marketplace
|
|
|-
|Copado
|1.2
|September 2021
|Software
| / 
|
|-
|Dada
|1.2
|August 2018
|
|
|
|-
|Dental Monitoring
|1.2
|October 2021
|Healthcare
|
|
|-
|Deutsche Health
|1.2
|August 2020
|
| / 
|
|-
|Droom
|1.2
|July 2021
|Marketplace
|
|Sandeep Aggarwal
|-
|Fair
|1.2
|December 2018
|
|
|
|-
|FirstCry
|1.2
|February 2020
|E-commerce
|
|
|-
|FloQast
|1.2
|July 2021
|Software
|
|
|-
|Forto
|1.2
|June 2021
|Software
|
|
|-
|Glossier
|1.2
|March 2019
|
|
|
|-
|Intercom
|1.2
|March 2018
|Software
|
|
|-
|Kyriba
|1.2
|October 2021
|Cloud software
|
|
|-
|MindTickle
|1.2
|August 2021
|Software as a service
|
|
|-
|MyGlamm
|1.2
|November 2021
|E-commerce
|
|
|-
|Rohlik
|1.2
|June 2021
|Retail
|
|
|-
|upGrad
|1.2
|August 2021
|Educational technology
|
|
|-
|Workhuman
|1.2
|June 2020
|Software
|
|
|-
|Sysdig
|1.18
|April 2021
|Cybersecurity
|
|
|-
|Acko
|1.1
|October 2021
|Insurance
|
|
|-
|Apna
|1.1
|September 2021
|
|
|
|-
|Carousell
|1.1
|September 2021
|Marketplace
|
|
|-
|CoinDCX
|1.1
|August 2021
|Cryptocurrency
|
|Sumit Gupta, Neeraj Khandelwal
|-
|GlobalBees
|1.1
|December 2021
|
|
|
|-
|Luoji Siwei
|1.1
|September 2017
|
|
|
|-
|Nexthink
|1.1
|February 2021
|Technology
|
|
|-
|Sisense
|1.1
|January 2020
|Business intelligence
| / 
|
|-
|SmartNews
|1.1
|August 2019
|
|
|
|-
|Trax
|1.1
|May 2019
|
| / 
|
|-
|Virta Health
|1.1
|December 2020
|Healthcare
|
|
|-
|Benevity
|1.1
|December 2020
|Software as a service
|
|Bryan de Lottinville
|-
|Zego
|1.1
|March 2021
|Insurance
|
|
|-
|Instabase
|1.05
|October 2019
|Software
|
|Anant Bhardwaj
|-
|Rivigo
|1.05
|October 2019
|Logistics
|
|Deepak Garg, Gazal Kalra
|-
|Aprogen
|1.04
|December 2019
|
|
|
|-
|Pentera
|1.0
|January 2022
|Cybersecurity
|
|Arik Liberzon, Arik Faingold
|-
|Emplifi
|1+
|March 2022
|Technology
|,  and Europe
|
|-
|Gymshark
|1+
|August 2020
|Sportswear
|
|Ben Francis, Lewis Morgan
|-
|Kopi Kenangan
|1+
|December 2021
|Coffee shop
|
|
|-
|Clara
|1+
|December 2021
|Financial technology
|
|
|-
|58 Daojia
|1+
|October 2015
|
|
|
|-
|Acronis
|1+
|September 2019
|Software
| / 
|
|-
|Aircall
|1+
|October 2021
|Cloud
|
|
|-
|Ajaib
|1+
|October 2021
|Financial technology
|
|
|-
|Amber Group
|1+
|June 2021
|Cryptocurrency
|
|
|-
|AppDirect
|1+
|October 2015
|
|
|
|-
|Aqua Security
|1+
|March 2021
|Cloud computing
|
|
|-
|Asia First Media
|1+
|September 2019
|Media
|
|
|-
|Assent Compliance
|1+
|January 2022
|Supply chain management
|
|
|-
|Beibei
|1+
|June 2016
|E-commerce
|
|
|-
|Blackbuck
|1+
|July 2021
|Logistics
|
|
|-
|Back market
|1+
|October 2021
|E-commerce
|
|
|-
|Bluecore
|1+
|August 2021
|E-commerce
|
|
|-
|Bringg
|1+
|June 2021
|Logistics
|
|
|-
|Cadence Solutions, Inc.
|1+
|December 2021
|Healthcare
|
|Chris Altchek
|-
|Calabrio
|1+
|March 2021
|Software
|
|
|-
|Carro
|1+
|June 2021
|Marketplace
|
|
|-
|Carsome
|1+
|July 2021
|Marketplace
|
|
|-
|Chubao Technology
|1+
|May 2017
|
|
|
|-
|Dream Games
|1+
|June 2021
|Video games
|
|
|-
|Dt Dream
|1+
|June 2017
|
|
|
|-
|Dunamu
|1+
|Jul 2021
|Financial technology
|
|-
|DXY
|1+
|April 2018
|
|
|
|-
|Earnix
|1+
|February 2021
|Financial technology
|
|
|-
|Ebanx
|1+
|October 2019
|Financial services
|
|
|-
|EMPG
|1+
|June 2020
|Real estate technology
|
|
|-
|eSentire
|1+
|Feb 2022
|Cybersecurity
| / 
|
|-
|Flash Express
|1+
|June 2021
|Logistics
|
|
|-
|Flexe
|1+
|July 2022
|Logistics
|
|Karl Siebrecht
|-
|Flutterwave
|1+
|March 2021
|Financial technology
| / 
|
|-
|Fractal
|1+
|January 2022
|Artificial intelligence
|/ 
|
|-
|FreshBooks
|1+
|August 2021
|Accounting software
|
|
|-
|Frontline Education
|1+
|September 2017
|
|
|
|-
|FXiaoKe
|1+
|January 2018
|
|
|
|-
|Gelato
|1+
|August 2021
|
|
|
|-
|GeoComply
|1+
|March 2021
|Cybersecurity
|
|
|-
|GetYourGuide
|1+
|May 2019
|Travel
|
|
|-
|Glance
|1+
|December 2020
|Artificial intelligence
|
|
|-
|Go1
|1+
|July 2021
|Education
|
|
|-
|GoGoVan
|1+
|September 2017
|Technology
|
|
|-
|Gorillas
|1+
|March 2021
|Retail
|
|
|-
|Gousto
|1+
|November 2020
|Meal kit
|
|
|-
|Blinkit
|1+
|June 2021
|Retail
|
|
|-
|Grover
|1+
|April 2022 
|E-commerce
|
|Michael Cassau
|-
|Grove Collaborative
|1+
|September 2019
|
|
|
|-
|Hailo
|1+
|June 2021
|Electronics
|
|
|-
|HighRadius
|1+
|January 2020
|Software as a service
| / 
|
|-
|-
|Huikedu Group
|1+
|May 2018
|
|
|
|-
|iCarbonX
|1+
|July 2016
|Healthcare
|
|
|-
|IFood
|1+
|November 2018
|Food delivery
|
|
|-
|IGAWorks
|1+
|Aug 2021
|Advertising technology
|
|
|-
|Improbable
|1+
|May 2017
|Cloud computing
|
|
|-
|Infobip
|1+
|July 2020
|Cloud communications
| / 
|Silvio Kutić, Izabel Jelenić, Roberto Kutić
|-
|Injective
|1+
|April 2021
|Financial technology
|
|Eric Chen, Albert Chon
|-
|InMobi
|1+
|May 2017
|Internet
|
|Naveen Tewari, Mohit Saxena, Amit Gupta and Abhay Singhal
|-
|InVision
|1+
|November 2017
|
|
|
|-
|Ivalua
|1+
|May 2020
|
|
|
|-
|Jollychic
|1+
|May 2018
|
|
|
|-
|JoyTunes
|1+
|June 2021
|Music
|
|
|-
|Kitopi
|1+
|July 2021
|Ghost kitchen
|
|
|-
|Klook
|1+
|April 2019
|
|
|
|-
|Lamabang
|1+
|February 2017
|
|
|
|-
|LetsGetChecked
|1+
|June 2021
|Healthcare
|
|
|-
|Licious
|1+
|October 2021
|Retail
|
|Abhay Hanjura, Vivek Gupta
|-
|Lydia
|1+
|August 2022
|Finance
|
|
|-
|Lilium GmbH
|1+
|June 2020
|Transportation
|
|
|-
|LinkSure Network (WiFi Master Key)
|1+
|January 2015
|
|
|
|-
|Liquid Group
|1+
|April 2019
|Cryptocurrency
|
|
|-
|LMAX Group
|1+
|July 2021
|Financial technology
|
|
|-
|Locus Robotics
|1+
|February 2021
|Robotics
|
|
|-
|
|1+
|January 2020
|Real estate
|
|
|-
|Lunar
|1+
|July 2021
|Financial technology
|
|
|-
|
|1+
|June 2019
|Logistics
|
|
|-
|Tiket.com
|1+
|December 2021
|Travel
|
|
|-
|Lookout
|1+
|August 2014
|Cybersecurity
|
|
|-
|
|1+
|January 2021
|Furniture
|
|
|-
|Maimai
|1+
|August 2018
|
|
|
|-
|Matrixport
|1+
|August 2021
|Cryptocurrency
|
|
|-
||Meero
|1+
|June 2019
|Internet
|
|
|-
|Mensa Brands
|1+
|November 2021
|E-commerce
|
|
|-
|Mia.com
|1+
|October 2016
|
|
|
|-
|MindMaze
|1+
|February 2016
|
|
|
|-
|MobiKwik
|1+
|October 2021
|Financial technology
|
|
|-
|MobileCoin
|1+
|August 2021
|Cryptocurrency
|
|
|-
|Mobvoi
|1+
|October 2015
|Artificial intelligence
|
|
|-
|Mofang Apartment
|1+
|April 2016
|
|
|
|-
|Moglix
|1+
|May 2021
|E-commerce
| / 
|Rahul Garg
|-
|Moka
|1+
|November 2021
|Human resource management
|
|
|-
|Morning Consult
|1+
|June 2021
|
|
|
|-
|Ninja Van
|1+
|September 2021
|Logistics
|
|
|-
|Nium
|1+
|July 2021
|Financial technology
|
|
|-
|NoBroker
|1+
|November 2021
|
|
|Akhil Gupta, Amit Agarwal, Saurabh Garg
|-
|Numbrs
|1+
|August 2019
|Financial technology
|
|
|-
|Kredivo
|1+
|January 2022
|Financial technology
|
|
|-
|OCSiAl
|1+
|March 2019
|Nanotechnology
|
|
|-
|Opn (Synqa)
|1+
|May 2022
|Financial technology
|
|Jun Hasegawa, Ezra Don Harinsut
|-
|OrCam
|1+
|February 2018
|Health
|
|
|-
|PandaDoc
|1+
|September 2021
|Software as a service
|
|Mikita Mikado, Sergey Barysiuk
|-
|Pantheon Systems
|1+
|July 2021
|WebOps
|
|
|-
|PatSnap
|1+
|March 2021
|Intellectual property
|
|
|-
|Perimeter 81
|1
|June 2022 
|Network security
||
|Sagi Gidali, Amit Bareket
|-
|Picsart
|1+
|August 2021
|Graphic design
| / 
|Hovhannes Avoyan, Artavazd Mehrabyan, Mikayel Vardanyan
|-
|Pipedrive
|1+
|November 2020
|CRM
| / 
|
|-
|Playco
|1+
|September 2020
|Mobile gaming
|
|
|-
|Printful
|1+
|May 2021
|Technology
|
|
|-
|Redis Labs
|1+
|August 2020
|Software
| / 
|
|-
|REEF Technology
|1+
|November 2020
|Real estate technology
|
|
|-
|Quizlet
|1+
|May 2020
|Educational technology
|
|
|-
|Revolution Precrafted
|1+
|October 2017
|Architecture
|
|
|-
|Rubicon Global
|1+
|September 2017
|Waste management
|
|
|-
|Sennder
|1+
|January 2021
|Logistics
|
|
|-
|Shift Technology
|1+
|May 2021
|Artificial intelligence
|
|
|-
|Shippo
|1+
|June 2021
|
|
|Laura Behrens Wu, Simon Kreuz
|-
|Sift
|1+
|April 2021
|Fraud prevention
|
|
|-
|Slice
|1+
|November 2021
|Financial technology
|
|
|-
|SmartAsset
|1+
|June 2021
|Financial technology
|
|
|-
|SmartMore
|1+
|June 2021
|Artificial intelligence
|
|
|-
|Snapdeal
|1+
|May 2017
|E-commerce
|
|Rohit Bansal, Kunal Bahl
|-
|Socar
|1+
|October 2020
|Car sharing
|
|
|-
|SoundHound
|1+
|May 2018
|
|
|
|-
|Spendesk
|1
|August 2022
|Financial software
|
|
|-
||Splashtop
|1+
|January 2021
|Software
|
|
|-
|Staffbase
|1.1
|March 2022
|Software as a service
|
|Frank Wolf, Lutz Gerlach, Martin Bohringer
|-
|Swile
|1+
|October 2021
|Financial services
|
|
|-
|Tekion
|1+
|October 2020
|Software as a service
|
|
|-
|Tenstorrent
|1+
|May 2021
|Semiconductors
|
|
|-
|Tezign
|1+
|October 2021
|Software
|
|
|-
|Tongdun Technology
|1+
|October 2017
|
|
|
|-
|Tractable
|1+
|June 2021
|Artificial intelligence
|
|
|-
|Tresata
|1+
|October 2018
|
|
|
|-
|TrueLayer
|1+
|September 2021
|Financial technology
|
|
|-
|Trustly
|1+
|June 2020
|Financial technology
|
|
|-
|Turo
|1+
|July 2019
|Car sharing
|
|
|-
|Udacity
|1+
|November 2015
|Education
|
|
|-
|Unisound
|1+
|July 2018
|Technology
|
|
|-
|Vedantu
|1+
|September 2021
|Educational technology
|
|
|-
|Blibli
|1+
|December 2021
|E-commerce
|
|
|-
|-
|Verbit
|1+
|June 2021
|Software
|
|
|-
|VerSe Innovation
|1+
|December 2020
|Technology
|
|Virendra Gupta
|-
|Visier
|1+
|June 2021
|Technology
|
|
|-
|volocopter
|1+
|March 2021
|Transportation
|
|
|-
|Vox Media
|1+
|August 2015
|Digital media
|
|
|-
|VTS
|1+
|May 2019
|
|
|
|-
|Wacai.com
|1+
|July 2018
|
|
|
|-
|WeLab
|1+
|December 2019
|Financial technology
|
|
|-
|Womai
|1+
|October 2015
|
|
|
|-
|Xendit
|1+
|September 2021
|Financial technology
|
|
|-
|Xiaozhu.com
|1+
|November 2017
|
|
|
|-
|YH Global
|1+
|September 2017
|Telecommunications
|
|
|-
|Yidian Zixun
|1+
|October 2017
|
|
|
|-
|Yitu Technology
|1+
|July 2018
|
|
|
|-
|YunQuNa
|1+
|May 2021
|Logistics
|
|
|-
|Zenoti
|1+
|December 2020
|Software company
| / 
|
|-
|Zhaogang.com
|1+
|July 2017
|
|
|
|-
|Zhuanzhuan
|1+
|April 2017
|
|
|
|-
|Zuoyebang
|1+
|July 2018
|
|
|
|-
|LINE MAN Wongnai
|1+
|September 2022
|E-commerce, Food delivery
|
|
|-
|ReliaQuest
|1+
|December 2021
|Cybersecurity
|
|Brian Murphy
|-
|DANA
|1+
|September 2022
|Financial technology
|
|
|-
|Deezer
|1
|August 2022
|Music
|
|
|-
|Ecovadis
|1
|August 2022
|Environmental,_social,_and_corporate_governance
|
|
|-
|Scandit
|1
|February 2022
|Software
|
|Samuel Mueller, Christian Floerkemeier, Christof Roduner
|-
|BlueVoyant
|1+
|February 2022
|Cybersecurity
|
|Jim Rosenthal, Chris Meissner, Jim Thompson, and Arun Sankaran
|-
|Payhawk
|1+
|March 2022
|Financial technology
|
|
|-
|Einride
|1.44
|April 2022
|Technology
|
|
|-
|Voi
|1+
|April 2022
|
|
|
|-
|Neo Financial
| 1
|May 2022
|Financial technology
|
|Andrew Chau, Jeff Adamson, Kris Read
|-
|Physics Wallah
|1.1
|June 2022
|Educational technology
|
|Alakh Pandey
|-
|OneCard
|1.4+
|July 2022
|Financial technology
|
| Anurag Sinha, Rupesh Kumar, Vaibhav Hathi
|-
|5ire
|1.5+
|July 2022
|Technology
|
|Pratik Gauri
|}

Former unicorns 
These companies were formerly unicorns, but exited the list due to IPO or acquisitions:

References 

Entrepreneurship
Unicorn